Harvie Maitland Conn (April 7, 1933 – August 28, 1999) was professor of missions at Westminster Theological Seminary, Philadelphia.

Biography 
Conn was born in Regina, Saskatchewan and studied at Calvin College and Westminster Theological Seminary. He was a missionary in South Korea prior to his appointment at WTS and also served as editor of Urban Mission. Conn was an ordained minister in the Orthodox Presbyterian Church.

Legacy 
A Festschrift was published in his honor: The Urban Face of Mission: Ministering the Gospel in a Diverse and Changing World, which included contributions from scholars such as William Dyrness and Charles H. Kraft.

D. G. Hart argues that Tim Keller's views about "word and deed ministries" are influenced by Conn's "theory and practice of urban missions and ministry." Tim Keller also cites Conn as saying that Jonah 2:9 is the central verse in the whole Bible: 'Salvation is of the LORD'.

References

1933 births
1999 deaths
Missiologists
Protestant missionaries in South Korea
People from Regina, Saskatchewan
Calvin University alumni
Westminster Theological Seminary alumni
Westminster Theological Seminary faculty
Orthodox Presbyterian Church ministers
Academic journal editors
Canadian Protestant missionaries
Canadian expatriates in South Korea
20th-century American clergy